Miradero is a barrio in the municipality of Cabo Rojo, Puerto Rico. Its population in 2010 was 15,521. Joyuda, a small fishing village on Cabo Rojos' gastronomic route, is in Miradero.

Features
There is a square called  in Miradero which happens to be the venue for the annual  (the festival of the fish).

Joyuda, a fishing village in Miradero is known for its many seafood restaurants along Puerto Rico Highway 102, a coastal road. Joyuda was the most impacted area of Cabo Rojo, when Hurricane María hit Puerto Rico on September 20, 2017.

The Ana G. Méndez University has a campus in Miradero.

History
Puerto Rico was ceded by Spain in the aftermath of the Spanish–American War under the terms of the Treaty of Paris of 1898 and became an unincorporated territory of the United States. In 1899, the United States Department of War conducted a census of Puerto Rico finding that the population of Miradero barrio was 2,011.

Gallery
Places in Miradero:

See also

 List of communities in Puerto Rico

References

Barrios of Cabo Rojo, Puerto Rico